Basketball or Nothing is a 2019 American documentarian non-scripted reality television series on Netflix filmed in Chinle, Arizona. The premise revolves around the lives of the Chinle High School boys’ basketball team based on the Navajo Nation reservation, the largest reservation in America.  The series featured Raul Mendoza as coach of the team.

The full season of Basketball or Nothing consisting of 6 episodes has been released on August 2, 2019.

Release
Basketball or Nothing was released on August 2, 2019, on Netflix streaming.

References

External links

2019 American television series debuts
2019 American television series endings
2010s American documentary television series
2010s American high school television series
English-language Netflix original programming
Netflix original documentary television series
Navajo Nation
Basketball in Arizona
Television series about teenagers